Hits 97 is a compilation album released in 1996. As a part of the Hits compilation series, it contains UK hit singles from mid-to-late 1996. The album had a rivalry with Now 35 released later in the month - due to the longstanding rivalry between the Now and Hits compilation series. Some royalties from Hits 97 went to three different children's charities due to the inclusion of the final track, "Knockin' on Heaven's Door" by Dunblane. Hits 97 was one of the only Hits albums to feature a non-single, "D'Yer Wanna Be a Spaceman?" by Oasis. (see Notes section)

Notes
Felix's song "Don't You Want Me" is the "'96 Pugilist Mix" which features samples from the Tango Blackcurrant TV advert St George.
Oasis' song "D'Yer Wanna Be a Spaceman?" is unusually featured, as it was not a 1996 single but in fact a B-side to the single Shakermaker, which was released in 1994. Its inclusion is perhaps due to Oasis' vast popularity at the time of release. The rival Now! series had also included earlier Oasis songs on the first two of their three 1996 releases.
Royalties from Dunblane's song "Knockin' on Heaven's Door" were split between the charities Save the Children, Childline and Children's Hospice Association Scotland.

Track listing

Disc one
 "What Becomes of the Brokenhearted" - Robson & Jerome 
 "Child" - Mark Owen
 "No Woman, No Cry" - Fugees (Refugee Camp)
 "Angel" - Simply Red 
 "Cosmic Girl" - Jamiroquai
 "I Love You Always Forever" - Donna Lewis 
 "Breakfast at Tiffany's" - Deep Blue Something 
 "It's All Coming Back to Me Now" - Celine Dion 
 "I'll Never Break Your Heart" - Backstreet Boys 
 "Forever Love" - Gary Barlow
 "Trippin'" - Mark Morrison 
 "Flava" - Peter Andre 
 "Golden Brown" - Kaleef
 "1st of tha Month" - Bone Thugs-N-Harmony 
 "I Need You" - 3T
 "I Belong to You" - Gina G 
 "One and One" - Robert Miles featuring Maria Nayler
 "Follow The Rules" - Livin' Joy 
 "Oh What A Night" - Clock

Disc two
 "You're Gorgeous" - Babybird
 "Hey Dude" - Kula Shaker 
 "Place Your Hands" - Reef
 "Kevin Carter" - Manic Street Preachers 
 "What If..." - The Lightning Seeds 
 "The Frog Princess" - The Divine Comedy 
 "The Circle" - Ocean Colour Scene 
 "One to Another" - The Charlatans
 "Statuesque" - Sleeper
 "D'Yer Wanna Be a Spaceman?" - Oasis
 "Breathe" - The Prodigy
 "Insomnia" - Faithless
 "Don't You Want Me" - Felix ("'96 Pugilist Mix", although it is only referred to as such in the booklet)
 "Driving" - Everything but the Girl 
 "Your Secret Love" - Luther Vandross 
 "On My Way Home" - Enya 
 "No More Alcohol" - Suggs
 "When I Fall in Love" - Ant & Dec 
 "Country Boy" - Jimmy Nail 
 "Hillbilly Rock Hillbilly Roll" - The Woolpackers
 "Knockin' on Heaven's Door" - Ted Christopher, Mark Knopfler on guitar, relatives of the Dunblane school massacre victims

References

1996 compilation albums
Hits (compilation series) albums